Sergio Javier Barila Martínez (born 15 March 1973) is a former professional footballer who played as a left back.

He amassed Segunda División B totals of 157 matches and 17 goals, during seven seasons.

Born in Spain, Barila represented Equatorial Guinea at international level.

Club career
Born in Valencia, Barila played for Valencia CF Mestalla, Atlético Saguntino, UD Barbastro, CD Alcoyano, Pontevedra CF, CD Castellón, CP Mérida, Levante UD, FC Cartagena, Gimnàstic de Tarragona, Getafe CF and Benidorm CF. He retired at the age of 31 after nearly a year on the sidelines with a knee injury, going on to work with Alcoyano in directorial capacities.

Barila made his debut as a professional on 12 January 1997, featuring the full 90 minutes for Mérida in a 1–1 away against CD Leganés in the Segunda División. He scored his first and only goal in the competition exactly nine months later, helping hosts Levante beat Real Jaén 2–0.

International career
Barila earned three caps for Equatorial Guinea, making his debut on 6 July 2003 against Morocco in the 2004 African Cup of Nations qualifiers and scoring his only goal on 11 October of that year in the 1–0 home win over Togo in the 2006 FIFA World Cup qualifying stage. He was the first Spanish-born player to be called up by the African national team.

Personal life
After retiring, Barila became a FIFA agent, also holding a degree in law.

References

External links

1973 births
Living people
Spanish sportspeople of Equatoguinean descent
Citizens of Equatorial Guinea through descent
Equatoguinean sportspeople of Spanish descent
Spanish footballers
Equatoguinean footballers
Footballers from Valencia (city)
Association football defenders
Segunda División players
Segunda División B players
Tercera División players
Valencia CF Mestalla footballers
Atlético Saguntino players
UD Barbastro players
CD Alcoyano footballers
Pontevedra CF footballers
CD Castellón footballers
CP Mérida footballers
Levante UD footballers
FC Cartagena footballers
Gimnàstic de Tarragona footballers
Getafe CF footballers
Benidorm CF footballers
Equatorial Guinea international footballers
Association football agents